Philippe Verneret (born 3 July 1962) is a French former alpine skier who competed in the 1984 Winter Olympics and 1988 Winter Olympics.

External links
 sports-reference.com
 

1962 births
Living people
French male alpine skiers
Olympic alpine skiers of France
Alpine skiers at the 1984 Winter Olympics
Alpine skiers at the 1988 Winter Olympics
Place of birth missing (living people)
20th-century French people